Abhishek Singh (born July 1982) is an Indian Graphic novelist acclaimed for his unique interpretations of myths and ancient philosophies instigating environmental themes, universal identity and spiritual oneness.

Abhishek was born in Gwalior and studied Animation and Film Design at India's National Institute of Design. He is the writer and illustrator for graphic novel Krishna-a journey within published by Image comics. He is the first Indian descent creator to be published by them in the history of North American comic-books. He was the illustrator for the Ramayana 3392 A.D and India Authentic comics. His work spans fine-art exhibitions, comic-books, animation and virtual reality films, original futuristic fables and re-imaginations of the mythological stories of India.

His paintings, drawings and digital works have featured in the following exhibitions: "Heroes and Villains: the Battle for Good in India’s Comics" at the Los Angeles County Museum of Art (LACMA);, "Transcendent Deities of India: The Everyday Occurrence of the Divine" at the Asia Society in Houston, Texas; at the ghats of Varanasi, India; a social impact project organized by Ojas Art Foundation, other exhibitions include "Dhyana Roopa" at the Academy of Fine Arts and Literature in Delhi, "India Imagined" sponsored by the Nirula Family Art Trust and at the visionary Fractal Gallery at Burning Man sponsored by the Black Rock Arts Foundation.

Recently, he made a virtual reality film for Deepak Chopra. The film explores VR as a therapeutic platform of the future where conventional medicine can be substituted with immersive experiences.

Abhishek has also designed and developed animation properties for Cartoon network, Honk-kong and India, He served as an art-director on UTV's Arjun-the warrior prince for a brief time. He was invited to design a small sequence for Juanjo Guarnido's "Freak Kitchen" animated video and has served a concept artist on several unannounced live-action and animated projects.

References

External links 
 Abhishek Singh, Official Site

Living people
Indian graphic novelists
1982 births
People from Gwalior
Novelists from Madhya Pradesh